Lala Cassandra Sloatman (born October 12, 1970) is an American model, actress and costumer. Her uncle was the musician Frank Zappa and her cousins are Ahmet, Diva, Moon, and Dweezil Zappa. She is frequently billed by her first name only and sometimes as Lala Zappa.

Early life
 
Born in Winter Park, Florida, Sloatman's first name is the Hawaiian form of Laura. Her father is second-generation Marine John ("Dunt") Sloatman III, whose sister, Gail, was the wife of the rock musician Frank Zappa. Sloatman moved to Santa Barbara, California, and after that to Los Angeles. She has numerous half-siblings on both sides of her family.

Career
In the 1980s, Sloatman appeared in the films Watchers (1988) and Dream a Little Dream (1989), alongside her then-boyfriend Corey Haim. Haim personally suggested her for the lead in a third movie, Prayer of the Rollerboys (1991), but the part went to Patricia Arquette. Sloatman's additional movie work includes Bunny Bunny Bunny (a short film which co-starred her cousin Moon and Kyle Richards), Pump Up the Volume (1990), Dragon: The Bruce Lee Story (1993, as Lauren Holly's college roommate), Buy One, Get One Free* (1996), Manfast (2003), Net Games (2003, as a sexy serial killer) and Sofia Coppola's Somewhere (2010).

Personal life 
Sloatman dated Haim in the late 1980s and C. Thomas Howell in the early 1990s. She has a daughter, Lula. Sloatman was married to Chris Robinson, the lead singer of The Black Crowes, from 1996 to 1998.

Filmography

References

External links
 

1970 births
Actresses from Florida
American film actresses
Living people
Female models from Florida
Zappa family